Georg Wilhelm von Siemens (30 July 1855, in Berlin – 14 October 1919, in Arosa, Switzerland) was a German telecommunications industrialist of the Siemens family.

Known as Wilhelm von Siemens, he was the second son of Werner von Siemens by first wife Mathilde Drumann, and was a general partner of the family company Siemens. Then under the name Siemens & Halske (S & H), the company was incorporated in 1897, with Wilhelm's uncle Carl Heinrich von Siemens as its first chairman of the Supervisory Board. Wilhelm's elder brother Arnold von Siemens succeeded his uncle as chairman of the board from 1904 until his death in 1918, while Wilhelm served as chairman of the board of the sister company, Siemens-Schuckertwerke AG, from 1903 until 1918. After his brother Arnold's death in 1918, he succeeded him as chairman of Siemens & Halske AG until his own death the following year. His successor in both chairmanships became his younger (half-)brother, Carl Friedrich von Siemens.

Married in 1882 to Eleonore Siemens (2 March 1860 – 26 July 1919), a first cousin, they were parents of:
 Wilhelm Ferdinand von Siemens (1885–1937), who after World War I shortly served as CEO of Siemens & Halske AG
 Mathilde Eleonore Eveline von Siemens (1888–1945)

He is credited with championing the Berlin to Iraq railway system that was to be completed about 1915. The direct competition such a railway system posed to British imperial domination could have been one of the causes of WW I. Beginning in 1899, he founded Siemensstadt, a locality of Berlin, in order to expand production by building new factories and worker's accommodation.

References
 August Rotth: Wilhelm von Siemens. Ein Lebensbild. Gedenkblätter zum 75jährigen Bestehen des Hauses Siemens & Halske. Berlin und Leipzig, 1922.
 Herbert Goetzler, Lothar Schoen: Wilhelm und Carl Friedrich von Siemens. Die zweite Unternehmergeneration. (hrsg. von Wilhelm Treueund Hans Pohl im Auftrag der Gesellschaft für Unternehmensgeschichte) Stuttgart, 1986.
Wilhelm von Siemens. – in: Wilfried Feldenkirchen / Eberhard Posner: The Siemens Entrepreneurs. Continuity and Change 1847–2005. Ten Portraits. Munich 2005, p. 58–83.
Genealogisches Handbuch des Adels, Adelige Häuser B Band XIII. Seite 388, Band 73 der Gesamtreihe, C. A. Starke Verlag, Limburg (Lahn) 1980, 
Neue Deutsche Biographie, Band 22, Seite 143

External links
Biography, Siemens Corporate Archives
The Versailles Thesis: The Roots of WWI, and WWII
 

1855 births
1919 deaths
Businesspeople from Berlin
German industrialists
People from the Province of Brandenburg
Siemens
Wilhelm, Georg